Brian Alainu'uese (born 19 March 1994) is a Samoa international rugby union player who currently plays as a lock for Toulon.

Rugby Union career

Amateur career

Alainu'uese has been drafted to Glasgow Hawks in the Scottish Premiership for the 2017-18 season.

Professional career

Provincial career

Alainu'uese first appeared for Waikato against Horowhenua-Kapiti in July 2013 after which he went on to make 6 appearances in that year's ITM Cup. Injury ruled him out of the following 2 seasons, however in 2016, injury-free he returned to the Waikato senior squad.

Super Rugby career

Alainu'uese was a member of the  Under-18 programme and later moved into the franchise's development squad for the 2014 and 2015 seasons.   He got his big chance during the 2015 Super Rugby season when he was called up as a short-term injury replacement by the Chiefs and went on to make 2 appearances.

Super Rugby statistics

Glasgow Warriors

On 24 October 2016 it was announced that he had signed for professional provincial team Glasgow Warriors in a deal to the end of the season. He made his competitive debut for Glasgow on 28 October 2016 against Benetton Treviso at Scotstoun Stadium. Langilangi Haupeakui also made his Warriors debut in the same match - Alain'uese replaced Tim Swinson on 51 minutes; and Haupeakui replaced Simone Favaro on 55 minutes. This gives Alainueuse a Glasgow Warrior No. 272 and Haupeakui a Glasgow Warrior No. 273.

Rugby Club Toulonnais

On 23 October 2018 Alainu'uese joined Toulon after being released from his Glasgow Warriors contract by mutual consent

International career

Alainu'uese was considered too young to be selected for the 2013 IRB Junior World Championship by New Zealand and instead was called up by Samoa for whom he made 5 appearances and scored 1 try.   The move does not prevent him from appearing for the All Blacks senior team in the future.

He was named in Samoa's squad for their Northern Hemisphere tour in 2022. He received 2 senior caps in that tour.

References

External links
 

1994 births
Living people
New Zealand rugby union players
Rugby union locks
Chiefs (rugby union) players
Waikato rugby union players
Glasgow Warriors players
Rugby union players from Invercargill
People educated at Wesley College, Auckland
New Zealand sportspeople of Samoan descent
Expatriate rugby union players in Scotland
Glasgow Hawks players
New Zealand expatriate sportspeople in Scotland